Berenice is a feminine name.

Berenice may also refer to:

Places 
 Berenice, ancient Greek name for Benghazi (in Libya); still a Catholic titular episcopal see
 Berenike (Epirus), ancient Greek city in Epirus
 Berenice Troglodytica, modern Medinet-el Haras, an ancient port of Egypt
 Berenice Panchrysos, an ancient port city of Egypt, near Sabae
 Berenice Epideires, near the mouth of the Red Sea, in modern Djibouti

Arts and entertainment 
 Berenice, an Italian opera by George Frideric Händel
 "Berenice" (short story), by Edgar Allan Poe
 Berenice (play), 1670 French tragedy by Jean Racine
 Bérénice, a French opera by Albéric Magnard after Racine's tragedy

Other uses 
 Coma Berenices, a constellation in the northern hemisphere
 653 Berenike, an asteroid
 Berenice (plant), a plant belonging to the family Campanulaceae
 Berenice (rocket), a series of French experimental rockets
 , sunk in the Bay of Biscay in the early morning of 21 June 1940.

See also 
 Bernice (disambiguation)

de:Berenike
zh:贝勒尼基